The right to a healthy environment or the right to a sustainable and healthy environment is a human right advocated by human rights organizations and environmental organizations to protect the ecological systems that provide human health. The right was acknowledged by the United Nations Human Rights Council during its 48th session in October 2021 in HRC/RES/48/13 and subsequently by the United Nations General Assembly on July 28, 2022 in A/RES/76/300. The right is often the basis for human rights defense by environmental defenders, such as land defenders, water protectors and  indigenous rights activists.

The right is interconnected with other health-focused human rights, such as the right to water and sanitation, right to food and right to health. The right to a healthy environment uses a human rights approach to protect environmental quality; this approach addresses the impact of environmental harm upon individual humans, as opposed to the more traditional approach of environmental regulation which focuses on impacts to other states or the environment itself. Yet another approach to environmental protection is rights of nature which tries to extend the rights enjoyed by humans and corporations to nature as well.

Role of the state 
The right creates an obligation of the state to regulate and enforce environmental laws, control pollution, and otherwise provide justice and protections for communities harmed by environmental problems.  The right to a healthy environment has been an important right for creating environmental legal precedents for climate change litigation and other environmental issues.

International approaches 
Historically, major United Nations' human rights instruments, like the Universal Declaration on Human Rights, the International Covenant on Civil and Political Rights or International Covenant on Economic, Social and Cultural Rights do not recognize the right to a healthy environment. The 1972 Stockholm Declaration recognizes the right, but is not a legally binding document. The 1992 Rio Declaration does not use the language of human rights, although it does state that individuals shall have access to information regarding environmental matters, participation in decision-making, and access to justice. The currently proposed UN resolution, the Global Pact for the Environment, if adopted, would be the first UN human rights instrument to include the right to a healthy environment.

Over 150 states in the UN have independently recognized the right in some form via legislation, litigation, constitutional law, treaty law or other legal authority. The African Charter on Human and Peoples' Rights, American Convention on Human Rights, Escazu Agreement, Arab Charter on Human Rights, and ASEAN Declaration on Human Rights each include a right to a healthy environment. Other human rights frameworks, such as the Convention on the Rights of the Child refer to environmental issues as they relate to the framework's focus, in this case children's rights.

UN Special Rapporteurs on Human Rights and the Environment John H. Knox (2012–2018) and David R. Boyd (2018–) have made recommendations on how to formalize these rights in international law. This was endorsed by a number of committees at the UN level, as well as local legal communities such as the New York City Bar, in 2020. 

The right to a healthy environment is at the core of the international approach to human rights and climate change. The effects of climate change on human rights are presented by OHCHR in a fact sheet with the most frequently asked questions on the subject.

UN Human Rights Council Resolution  

In 2021 during its 48th session, the United Nations Human Rights Council adopted a resolution (put forward by the core group comprising Costa Rica, Morocco, Slovenia, Switzerland and the Maldives, with Costa Rica being penholder), recognizing "The human right to a clean, healthy and sustainable environment", marking the first time that the body declared a human right. The resolution is not legally binding, but it "invites the United Nations General Assembly to consider the matter".

UN General Assembly Resolution 
In 2022 during its 76th session, the United Nations General Assembly adopted a resolution put forward by a core group including Costa Rica, Morocco, Slovenia, Switzerland, and the Maldives once again recognizing the human right to a clean, healthy, and sustainable environment. Although General Assembly resolutions are not legally binding, this resolution was welcomed by UN High Commissioner for Human Rights Michelle Bachelet, multiple special rapporteurs and members of some civil society organizations.

References 

Right to a healthy environment
Human rights